The Iran women's national kabaddi team represents the Islamic Republic of Iran in international kabaddi.

Team

coach

Tournament records
*Red border indicates that the tournament was hosted on home soil. Gold, silver, bronze backgrounds indicates 1st, 2nd and 3rd finishes respectively. Bold text indicates best finish in tournament.

Standard style

Asian Games

Asian Championship

Other styles

Circle World Cup

Asian Indoor Games

See also
 Sport in Iran

References
 Archive Results

External links
 International Kabaddi Federation

Kabaddi
National kabaddi teams
women's National kabaddi team
National women's kabaddi teams